The Missile Defense Agency (MDA) is the section of the United States government's Department of Defense responsible for developing a layered defense against ballistic missiles. It had its origins in the Strategic Defense Initiative (SDI) which was established in 1983 by Ronald Reagan and which was headed by Lt. General James Alan Abrahamson. Under the Strategic Defense Initiative's Innovative Sciences and Technology Office headed by physicist and engineer Dr. James Ionson, the investment was predominantly made in basic research at national laboratories, universities, and in industry. These programs have continued to be key sources of funding for top research scientists in the fields of high-energy physics, advanced materials, supercomputing/computation, and many other critical science and engineering disciplines—funding which indirectly supports other research work by top scientists, and which was most politically viable to fund within the Military budget of the United States environment. It was renamed the Ballistic Missile Defense Organization in 1993, and then renamed the Missile Defense Agency in 2002. The current director is U.S. Navy Vice Admiral Jon A. Hill.

Rapid changes in the strategic environment due to the rapid Dissolution of the Soviet Union led, in 1993, to Bill Clinton focusing on theater ballistic missiles and similar threats, and renaming it the Ballistic Missile Defense Organization, BMDO. With another change to a more global focus made by George W. Bush, in 2002 the organization became the Missile Defense Agency.

The Missile Defense Agency is partially or wholly responsible for the development of several ballistic missile defense (BMD) systems, including the Patriot PAC-3, Aegis BMD, THAAD and the Ground-Based Midcourse Defense system. They also led the development of numerous other projects, including the Multiple Kill Vehicle and the newer Multi-Object Kill Vehicle, the Kinetic Energy Interceptor and the Airborne Laser. As the inheritor of the SDI and BMDO work, the MDA continues to fund fundamental research in high-energy physics, supercomputing/computation, advanced materials, and many other science and engineering disciplines.

Mission statement

The MDA currently publishes the following mission statement:

The National Defense Authorization Act is cited as the original source of the MDA's mission:

International mission

Ballistic Missile Defense Systems (BMDS) must be capable of operating in different regions of the world to ensure the success of the MDA mission. The International Strategy was approved by the MDA Director in 2007. The general strategy for international efforts is:
Outreach: Communicate the importance of missile defense by promoting worldwide BMDS by sharing information with allies and partners.
Capability and Interoperability: Identify and integrate U.S and partner systems to create global missile defense system. Promote interoperability among allies.
Technology: Identify and evaluate possible international technology in support of BMDS capabilities.
Investment: Identify and execute investment opportunities with allies and partners.
Workforce: Shape a qualified workforce to execute the MDA International Strategy.

As of 2017 MDA was working on facilities in Germany, Romania, Poland, Japan, Qatar, Saudi Arabia and the United Arab Emirates.

Potential threats against the United States
Ballistic missile systems using advanced liquid- or solid-propellant propulsion are becoming more mobile, accurate and capable of striking targets over longer distances and are proliferating worldwide.
 Iran currently has short- and medium- range missiles with guidance systems. Iran's launch of a medium range, solid fuel ballistic missile demonstrates its ability to hit targets in Israel and southern Europe. Iran also successfully launched the Safir Space Launch Vehicle on Feb 2, 2009. It was then speculated that development of an ICBM was not far behind. Intelligence reports that a missile could have been built sometime between 2010 and 2015 perhaps using help from Russian and North Korean technology.
 North Korea currently deploys a Nodong ballistic missile capable of hitting Japan and South Korea, and is developing a new intermediate-range ballistic missile (IRBM) which could reach Guam and the Aleutian Islands. They also successfully demonstrated the staging and separation technologies required to launch a Taepo-Dong 2 ICBM which has the capability to reach the United States. The Taepodong missile was first tested in 2006, and failed 40 seconds into midflight. North Korean missiles are notoriously unreliable, and many of the DPRKs missile tests have failed, including the most recent Taepodong-2 launches in 2009 and 2012, and a failed launch of the BM25 Musudan in 2016. On 1 January 2017, North Korea announced its final preparation for a test of an ICBM, for the first time. On 6 March 2017, North Korea launched four missiles from Tongchang-ri, a known long-range missile site at 7:36 a.m. local time, one of which landed in the Sea of Japan, with the remaining three missiles landing in Japan's economic zone. On July 4, 2017 North Korea launched a ballistic missile that had the potential to be an ICBM. It flew into space and landed in the Sea of Japan. "The launch continues to demonstrate that North Korea poses a threat to the United States and our allies," a Pentagon statement said.
 Syria has been identified as a host for Short Range Ballistic Missiles (as it acquires equipment from North Korea and Iran).

Categories

MDA divides its systems into four phases: boost; ascent; mid-course; and terminal. Each of these corresponds to a different phase of the threat ballistic missile flight regime. Each phase offers different advantages and disadvantages to a missile defense system (see missile defense classified by trajectory phase), and the geography of each defended area dictates the types of systems which can be employed. The resultant flexible and layered defense approach concept is believed to improve overall defense effectiveness. The more opportunities a system has to neutralize a threat (e.g., by shooting down a missile), the better the chance of success.

Activities have also been categorized as fulfilling the goals of one of five "blocks". For example, "block 4.0" was stated as "Defend Allies and Deployed Forces in Europe from Limited Iranian Long-Range Threats and Expand Protection of U.S. Homeland". It included the US missile defense complex in Poland to be constructed, and the European Mid-course Radar (EMR), currently located at the Ronald Reagan Ballistic Missile Defense Test Site at Kwajalein Atoll, which was to have been modified and relocated to the Czech Republic.

On 17 September 2009, the Obama administration scrapped the "block 4.0" plan, in favor of a new so-called "European Phased Adaptive Approach" (EPAA).

Boost phase
Can intercept all ranges of missiles, but the missile boost phase is only from one to five minutes. It is the best time to track the missile because it is bright and hot. The missile defense interceptors and sensors must be in close proximity to the launch, which is not always possible. This is the most desirable interception phase because it destroys the missile early in flight at its most vulnerable point and the debris will typically fall on the launching nations' territory.

Ascent phase
This is the phase after powered flight but before the apogee. It is significantly less challenging than boost phase intercepts, less costly, minimizes the potential impact of debris and reduces the number of interceptors required to defeat a raid of missiles.

Midcourse phase
This phase begins after the booster burns out and begins coasting in space. This can last as long as 20 minutes. Any debris remaining will burn up as it enters the atmosphere. Ground based missile defense systems can defend from long-range and intermediate-range ballistic missiles in this phase. Mobile elements can defend against medium and short ranged missiles in midcourse.

Terminal phase
This phase is the last chance to intercept the warhead. This contains the least-desirable Interception Point (IP) because there is little room for error and the interception will probably occur close to the defended target.

Boost phase defense
 Kinetic Energy Interceptor (KEI) – in December 2003, MDA awarded a contract to Northrop Grumman for developing and testing. It will have to be launched from a location not too far from the launch site of the target missile (and is therefore less suitable against large countries), it has to be fired very soon after launch of the target, and it has to be very fast itself (6 km/s). In 2009, the Department of Defense and MDA determined the technological issues were  excessive and cancelled the program, allocating no funding for it in its later budget submission.
 Boeing YAL-1 Airborne Laser (ABL) – Team ABL proposed and won the contract for this system in 1996. A high-energy laser mounted on a converted 747 airliner was used to intercept a test target in January 2010, and the following month, successfully destroyed two test missiles. While the program has been cancelled due to concerns about its practicality with present technology (while successful the system was still extremely short ranged, likely needing to fly in heavily defended space to make an interception) the YAL-1 served to demonstrate the potential of such a system. The capabilities of being deployed rapidly to any part of the world and of intercepting a large number of missiles would make a future system extremely attractive.
 Network Centric Airborne Defense Element (NCADE) – On September 18, 2008 Raytheon announced it had been awarded a $10 million contract to continue research and development of NCADE, a missile defense system based on the AIM-120 AMRAAM.
One can distinguish disabling the warheads and just disabling the boosting capability. The latter has the risk of "shortfall": damage in countries between the launch site and the target location.

See also APS report.

Ascent phase defense
 Ascent phase intercept (API) – Emerging intercept technologies are being developed and designed to defeat launched missiles in their ascent phase. This phase is after the boost phase and prior to the threat missile's apogee (midcourse). The Ascent phase intercept program is still classified so there is little information on it.

Midcourse (ballistic) phase defense
 Ground-Based Midcourse Defense (GMD)
 Aegis Ballistic Missile Defense System (Aegis BMD)
 Multiple Kill Vehicle (MKV, originally Miniature Kill Vehicle): the Department of Defense has canceled the MKV program for the time being.

Hypersonic glide phase defense
 Glide phase interceptor (GPI)

Terminal phase defense
 Terminal High Altitude Area Defense (THAAD)
 PATRIOT Advanced Capability-3 (PAC-3)
 Arrow missile, a joint effort between the U.S. and Israel
 Medium Extended Air Defense System (MEADS), co-developmental program of the United States Department of Defense, Germany and Italy.

List of directors

See also
 Ground-Based Interceptor#Next generation interceptor (NGI)
 Joint Functional Component Command for Integrated Missile Defense
 United States Strategic Command
 National Missile Defense

References

External links

 Official website

 
United States Department of Defense agencies
Government agencies established in 2002
2002 establishments in the United States